Eric Forman is a New York-based artist and designer best known for his signal blocking chandelier sculpture Dis/Connect (2021), his installation Heart Squared (2020) in collaboration with MODU, and his sound object TreeShell (2013). Dis/Connect was featured as one of Fast Company's 2021 World Changing Ideas. Heart Squared was selected by the Cooper Hewitt, Smithsonian Design Museum as the winner of the Times Square Heart 2020 Design Competition. Throughout February 2020, Heart Squared was seen by over 300,000 people a day. TreeShell was selected by the Museum of Modern Art Design Store for its 2013 “Destination: NYC” series.

Biography 
Eric Forman received his B.A. from Vassar College in 1995, where he created his own course of study in “The Philosophical Ramifications of Computer Technology.” His studies culminated in a thesis titled “Virtual Reality: The Refiguring of Space, Real, and Subject”(1995), which investigated the conceptual impact of VR on media theory and philosophy. In the mid-1990s, he was one of the early members of Pseudo Programs, one of the world's original online streaming content services, where he worked on creating virtual environments for the early internet service provider Prodigy. Forman received his master's degree from ITP at Tisch School of the Arts (NYU) in 2002.

Eric Forman Studio was founded in 2003 and has produced primarily sculpture and installation art concerned with the intersection of technology and human, using “playful interaction to reveal issues of language, simulation, and perception.” In 2012, his studio became a founding member of New Lab at the Brooklyn Navy Yard.

Forman has also taught “Physical Computing” to artists and designers since 2003. He has taught at SIGGRAPH, RISD (Rhode Island School of Design) MFA Digital+Media, and SVA (School of Visual Arts) in New York City where he is currently the Head of Innovation in the MFA Interaction Design department.

Selected achievements

Selected exhibitions and works

Other professional work 

Eric Forman Studio also develops interactive technology for clients, most notably Marina Abromovic, Anthony McCall, Line Healthcare, Kate Spade, and The Living

References 

1973 births
Living people